Smith's Cove is a community in the Canadian province of Nova Scotia, located in the Municipality of the District of Digby. in Digby County. It is one of several villages in the Annapolis Valley district of Nova Scotia.

Smith's Cove is a small community, named after Loyalist Joseph Smith, that overlooks the Annapolis Basin. It is a popular destination for tourists during the summer, with two large campgrounds and seven motels, inns and cottages. Smith's Cove has a number of beaches, and beach-combing is a favorite activity. The Look Off has views of the Annapolis Basin, Bear River and the Digby Gut.  The Annapolis Valley Trail System, which follows the abandoned Dominion Atlantic Railway bed, is used by hikers, bikers and ATVers.

The Smith's Cove Old Temperance Hall Museum is located in the Old Meeting House on Highway 1 and has displays dating back to the 18th Century. Nearby is the Smiths Cove War Memorial. The Smith's Cove Baptist Church and the Smith's Cove Fire Hall are active in the community and are located side by side on North Old Post Road.

Events

The Smith's Cove Fire Department hosts fund-raisers, including the Scallywag Run, an 8-kilometer run/walk that usually takes place in late August.  Runners and walkers follow the plank (a sandbar that is uncovered during low tide) that connects one of the many beaches of Smith's Cove with Bear Island.

References
 Smith's Cove on Destination Nova Scotia
 Smith's Cove Trails
 Smith's Cove War Memorial
 Smith's Cove Old Temperance Hall Museum
 Smith's Cove Fire Department Scallywag Run
 The Annapolis Valley Trail System
 Smith's Cove on Nova Scotia's Backyard
 Annapolis Valley Trails Coalition

General Service Areas in Nova Scotia
Communities in Digby County, Nova Scotia
Tourist attractions in Digby County, Nova Scotia